The Washington Cancer Institute (WCI) is Washington, D.C.'s largest cancer care provider, treating more cancer patients than any other program in the nation's capital. The Washington Cancer Institute opened on May 9, 1992. Under the leadership of Dr. Sandra Swain, the Cancer Institute diagnosed more than 2,305 new cases during fiscal year 2007. There were more than 79,720 outpatient visits and more than 2,334 inpatient admissions during that period.  WCI provides comprehensive, interdisciplinary care including surgical, radiation and medical oncology services as well as counseling for patients and families, cancer education, community outreach program and clinical research trials. The Center for Breast Health saw 15,242 patients during fiscal year 2007.  WCI is affiliated with the Washington Hospital Center.

References

External links
 

Hospital buildings completed in 1992
1992 establishments in Washington, D.C.
Hospitals established in 1992
Hospitals in Washington, D.C.